Angiotensin-converting-enzyme inhibitors (ACE inhibitors) are a class of medication used primarily for the treatment of high blood pressure and heart failure. They work by causing relaxation of blood vessels as well as a decrease in blood volume, which leads to lower blood pressure and decreased oxygen demand from the heart.

ACE inhibitors inhibit the activity of angiotensin-converting enzyme, an important component of the renin–angiotensin system which converts angiotensin I to angiotensin II, and hydrolyses bradykinin. Therefore, ACE inhibitors decrease the formation of angiotensin II, a vasoconstrictor, and increase the level of bradykinin,  a peptide vasodilator. This combination is synergistic in lowering blood pressure. As a result of inhibiting the ACE enzyme in the bradykinin system, the ACE inhibitor drugs allow for increased levels of bradykinin which would normally be degraded. Bradykinin produces prostaglandin. This mechanism can explain the two most common side effects seen with ACE Inhibitors: angioedema and cough.

Frequently prescribed ACE inhibitors include benazepril, zofenopril, perindopril, trandolapril, captopril, enalapril, lisinopril, and ramipril.

Medical use
ACE inhibitors were initially approved for the treatment of hypertension and can be used alone or in combination with other anti-hypertensive medications.  Later, they were found useful for other cardiovascular and kidney diseases including:
 Acute myocardial infarction (heart attack) 
 Heart failure (left ventricular systolic dysfunction) 
 Kidney complications of diabetes mellitus (diabetic nephropathy) by means of decreasing the blood pressure and increasing perfusion in glomerular arterioles.

In treating high blood pressure, ACE inhibitors are often the first drug choice, particularly when diabetes is present, but age can lead to different choices and it is common to need more than one drug to obtain the desired improvement. There are fixed-dose combination drugs, such as ACE inhibitor and thiazide combinations. ACE inhibitors have also been used in chronic kidney failure and kidney involvement in systemic sclerosis (hardening of tissues, as scleroderma renal crisis). In those with stable coronary artery disease, but no heart failure, benefits are similar to other usual treatments.

In 2012, there was a meta-analysis published in the BMJ that described the protective role of ACE inhibitors in reducing the risk of pneumonia when compared to ARBs (Angiotensin II Receptor Blockers). The authors found a decreased risk in patients with previous stroke (54% risk reduction), with heart failure (37%  risk reduction), and of Asian descent (43% risk reduction vs 54% risk reduction in non-Asian population). However, no reduced pneumonia related mortality was observed.

Other
ACE inhibitors may also be used to help decrease excessive water consumption in people with schizophrenia resulting in psychogenic polydipsia. A double-blind, placebo-controlled trial showed that when used for this purpose, enalapril led to decreased consumption (determined by urine output and osmolality) in 60% of people; the same effect has been demonstrated in other ACE inhibitors.

Additionally ACEi are commonly used after renal transplant to manage post-transplant erythrocytosis, a condition characterised by a persistently high hematocrit greater than 51% which often develops 8–24 months after successful transplantation, as ACEi have been shown to decrease erythropoietin production.

Adverse effects
Common side effects include: low blood pressure, cough, hyperkalemia, headache, dizziness, fatigue, nausea, and kidney impairment.

The main adverse effects of ACE inhibition can be understood from their pharmacological action. The other reported adverse effects are liver problems and effects on the fetus. Kidney problems may occur with all ACE inhibitors that directly follows from their mechanism of action. Patients starting on an ACE inhibitor usually have a modest reduction in glomerular filtration rate (GFR). However, the decrease may be significant in conditions of pre-existing decreased renal perfusions, such as renal artery stenosis, heart failure, polycystic kidney disease, or volume depletion. In these patients, the maintenance of GFR depends on angiotensin-II-dependent efferent vasomotor tone. Therefore, renal function should be closely monitored over the first few days after initiation of treatment with ACE inhibitor in patients with decreased renal perfusion. A moderate reduction in renal function, no greater than 30% rise in serum creatinine, that is stabilized after a week of treatment is deemed acceptable as part of the therapeutic effect, providing the residual renal function is sufficient.

Reduced GFR is especially a problem if the patient is concomitantly taking an NSAID and a diuretic. When the three drugs are taken together,  the risk of developing renal failure is significantly increased.

High blood potassium is another possible complication of treatment with an ACE inhibitor due to its effect on aldosterone. Suppression of angiotensin II leads to a decrease in aldosterone levels. Since aldosterone is responsible for increasing the excretion of potassium, ACE inhibitors can cause retention of potassium. Some people, however, can continue to lose potassium while on an ACE inhibitor. Hyperkalemia may decrease the velocity of impulse conduction in the nerves and muscles, including cardiac tissues. This leads to cardiac dysfunction and neuromuscular consequences, such as muscle weakness, paresthesia, nausea, diarrhea, and others. Close monitoring of potassium levels is required in patients receiving treatment with ACE inhibitors who are at risk of hyperkalemia.

Another possible adverse effect specific for ACE inhibitors, but not for other RAAS blockers, is an increase in bradykinin level.

A persistent dry cough is a relatively common adverse effect believed to be associated with the increases in bradykinin levels produced by ACE inhibitors, although the role of bradykinin in producing these symptoms has been disputed. Many cases of cough in people on ACE inhibitors may not be from the medication itself, however. People who experience this cough are often switched to angiotensin II receptor antagonists.

Some (0.7%) develop angioedema due to increased bradykinin levels. A genetic predisposition may exist.

A severe rare allergic reaction can affect the bowel wall and secondarily cause abdominal pain.

Blood
Hematologic effects, such as neutropenia, agranulocytosis and other blood dyscrasias, have occurred during therapy with ACE inhibitors, especially in people with additional risk factors.

Pregnancy
In pregnant women, ACE inhibitors taken during all the trimesters have been reported to cause congenital malformations, stillbirths, and neonatal deaths. Commonly reported fetal abnormalities include hypotension, renal dysplasia, anuria/oliguria, oligohydramnios, intrauterine growth retardation, pulmonary hypoplasia, patent ductus arteriosus, and incomplete ossification of the skull. Overall, about half of newborns exposed to ACE inhibitors are adversely affected, leading to birth defects.

ACE inhibitors are ADEC pregnancy category D and should be avoided in women who are likely to become pregnant. In the U.S., ACE inhibitors must be labeled with a boxed warning concerning the risk of birth defects when taken during the second and third trimester. Their use in the first trimester is also associated with a risk of major congenital malformations, particularly affecting the cardiovascular and central nervous systems.

Overdose
Symptoms and Treatment: There are few reports of ACE inhibitor overdose in the literature. The most likely manifestations are hypotension, which may be severe, hyperkalemia, hyponatremia and renal impairment with metabolic acidosis. Treatment should be mainly symptomatic and supportive, with volume expansion using normal saline to correct hypotension and improve renal function, and gastric lavage followed by activated charcoal and a cathartic to prevent further absorption of the drug. Captopril, enalapril, lisinopril and perindopril are known to be removable by hemodialysis.

Contraindications and precautions
The ACE inhibitors are contraindicated in people with:
 Pregnancy or breastfeeding
 Previous angioedema associated with ACE inhibitor therapy
 Bilateral renal artery stenosis
 Hypersensitivity to ACE inhibitors

ACE inhibitors should be used with caution in people with:
 Impaired renal function
 Aortic valve stenosis or cardiac outflow obstruction
 Hypovolemia or dehydration
 Hemodialysis with high-flux polyacrylonitrile membranes

A combination of ACE inhibitor with other drugs may increase effects of these drugs, but also the risk of adverse effects. The commonly reported adverse effects of drug combination with ACE inhibitor are acute renal failure, hypotension, and hyperkalemia. The drugs interacting with ACE inhibitor should be prescribed with caution. Special attention should be given to combinations of ACE inhibitor with other RAAS blockers, diuretics (especially potassium-sparing diuretics), NSAIDs, anticoagulants, cyclosporine, DPP-4 inhibitors, and potassium supplements.

Potassium supplementation should be used with caution and under medical supervision owing to the hyperkalemic effect of ACE inhibitors.

Concomitant use with cyclooxygenase inhibitors tends to decrease ACE inhibitor's hypotensive effect.

Mechanism of action
ACE inhibitors reduce the activity of the renin–angiotensin–aldosterone system (RAAS) as the primary etiologic (causal) event in the development of hypertension in people with diabetes mellitus, as part of the insulin-resistance syndrome or as a manifestation of renal disease.

Renin–angiotensin–aldosterone system

The renin–angiotensin–aldosterone system is a major blood pressure regulating mechanism. Markers of electrolyte and water imbalance in the body such as hypotension, low distal tubule sodium concentration, decreased blood volume and high sympathetic tone trigger the release of the enzyme renin from the cells of juxtaglomerular apparatus in the kidney.

Renin activates a circulating liver derived prohormone angiotensinogen by proteolytic cleavage of all but its first ten amino acid residues known as angiotensin I. ACE (angiotensin converting enzyme) then removes a further two residues, converting angiotensin I into angiotensin II. ACE is found in the pulmonary circulation and in the endothelium of many blood vessels. The system increases blood pressure by increasing the amount of salt and water the body retains, although angiotensin is also very good at causing the blood vessels to tighten (a potent vasoconstrictor).

Effects
ACE inhibitors block the conversion of angiotensin I (ATI) to angiotensin II (ATII). They thereby lower arteriolar resistance and increase venous capacity; decrease cardiac output, cardiac index, stroke work, and volume; lower resistance in blood vessels in the kidneys; and lead to increased natriuresis (excretion of sodium in the urine). Renin increases in concentration in the blood as a result of negative feedback of conversion of ATI to ATII. ATI increases for the same reason; ATII and aldosterone decrease. Bradykinin increases because of less inactivation by ACE.

Under normal conditions, angiotensin II has these effects:
 Vasoconstriction (narrowing of blood vessels) and vascular smooth muscle hypertrophy (enlargement) induced by ATII may lead to increased blood pressure and hypertension. Further, constriction of the efferent arterioles of the kidney leads to increased perfusion pressure in the glomeruli.
 It contributes to ventricular remodeling and ventricular hypertrophy of the heart through stimulation of the proto-oncogenes c-fos, c-jun, c-myc, transforming growth factor beta (TGF-B), through fibrogenesis and apoptosis (programmed cell death). 
 Stimulation by ATII of the adrenal cortex to release aldosterone, a hormone that acts on kidney tubules, causes sodium and chloride ions retention and potassium excretion. Sodium is a "water-holding" ion, so water is also retained, which leads to increased blood volume, hence an increase in blood pressure.
 Stimulation of the posterior pituitary to release vasopressin (antidiuretic hormone, ADH) also acts on the kidneys to increase water retention. If ADH production is excessive in heart failure, Na+ level in the plasma may fall (hyponatremia), and this is a sign of increased risk of death in heart failure patients.
 A decrease renal protein kinase C

During the course of ACE inhibitor use, the production of ATII is decreased, which prevents aldosterone release from the adrenal cortex. This allows the kidney to excrete sodium ions along with obligate water, and retain potassium ions. This decreases blood volume, leading to decreased blood pressure.

Epidemiological and clinical studies have shown ACE inhibitors reduce the progress of diabetic nephropathy independently from their blood pressure-lowering effect. This action of ACE inhibitors is used in the prevention of diabetic renal failure.

ACE inhibitors have been shown to be effective for indications other than hypertension even in patients with normal blood pressure. The use of a maximum dose of ACE inhibitors in such patients (including for prevention of diabetic nephropathy, congestive heart failure, and prophylaxis of cardiovascular events) is justified, because it improves clinical outcomes independently of the blood pressure-lowering effect of ACE inhibitors. Such therapy, of course, requires careful and gradual titration of the dose to prevent the effects of rapidly decreasing blood pressure (dizziness, fainting, etc.).

ACE inhibitors have also been shown to cause a central enhancement of parasympathetic nervous system activity in healthy volunteers and patients with heart failure. This action may reduce the prevalence of malignant cardiac arrhythmias, and the reduction in sudden death reported in large clinical trials.
ACE Inhibitors also reduce plasma norepinephrine levels, and its resulting vasoconstriction effects, in heart failure patients, thus breaking the vicious circles of sympathetic and renin angiotensin system activation, which sustains the downward spiral in cardiac function in congestive heart failure

The ACE inhibitor enalapril has also been shown to reduce cardiac cachexia in patients with chronic heart failure. Cachexia is a poor prognostic sign in patients with chronic heart failure.
ACE inhibitors are under early investigation for the treatment of frailty and muscle wasting (sarcopenia) in elderly patients without heart failure.

Examples
Currently, there are 10 ACE inhibitors approved for use in the United States by the FDA: captopril (1981), enalapril (1985), lisinopril (1987), benazepril (1991), fosinopril (1991), quinapril (1991), ramipril (1991), perindopril (1993), moexipril (1995) and trandolapril (1996).

ACE inhibitors are easily identifiable by their common suffix, '-pril'. ACE inhibitors can be divided into three groups based on their molecular structure of the enzyme binding sites (sulfhydryl, phosphinyl, carboxyl) to the active center of ACE:

Sulfhydryl-containing agents
 Alacepril
 Captopril (trade name Capoten), the first ACE inhibitor.
Zofenopril

These agents appear to show antioxidative properties but may be involved in adverse events such as skin eruptions.

Dicarboxylate-containing agents
This is the largest group, including:
 Enalapril (Vasotec/Renitec/Berlipril/Enap/Enalapril Profarma)
 Ramipril (Altace/Prilace/Ramace/Ramiwin/Triatec/Tritace/Ramitac)
 Quinapril (Accupril)
 Perindopril (Coversyl/Aceon/Perindo)
 Lisinopril (Listril/Lopril/Novatec/Prinivil/Zestril, Lisidigal)
 Benazepril (Lotensin)
 Imidapril (Tanatril)
 Trandolapril (Mavik/Odrik/Gopten)
 Cilazapril (Inhibace)

Phosphonate-containing agents
 Fosinopril (Fositen/Monopril) is the only member of this group

Naturally occurring

 A comprehensive resource on anti-hypertensive peptides is available in form of a database. It contains around 1700 unique antihypertensive peptides
Arfalasin (HOE 409) is angiotensin antagonist.

Dairy products
 Casokinins and lactokinins, breakdown products of casein and whey, occur naturally after ingestion of milk products, especially cultured milk. Their role in blood pressure control is uncertain.
 The lactotripeptides Val-Pro-Pro and Ile-Pro-Pro produced by the probiotic Lactobacillus helveticus or derived from casein have been shown to have ACE-inhibiting and antihypertensive functions. In one study, L. helveticus PR4 was isolated from Italian cheeses.

Comparative information
All ACE inhibitors have similar antihypertensive efficacy when equivalent doses are administered. The main differences lie with captopril, the first ACE inhibitor. Captopril has a shorter duration of action and an increased incidence of adverse effects. It is also the only ACE inhibitor capable of passing through the blood–brain barrier, although the significance of this characteristic has not been shown to have any positive clinical effects.

In a large clinical study, one of the agents in the ACE inhibitor class, ramipril (Altace), demonstrated an ability to reduce the mortality rates of patients with a myocardial infarction and to slow the subsequent development of heart failure. This finding was made after it was discovered that regular use of ramipril reduced mortality rates even in test subjects who didn't have hypertension.

Some believe ramipril's additional benefits may be shared by some or all drugs in the ACE-inhibitor class. However, ramipril currently remains the only ACE inhibitor for which such effects are actually evidence-based.

A meta-analysis confirmed that ACE inhibitors are effective and certainly the first-line choice in hypertension treatment. This meta-analysis was based on 20 trials and a cohort of 158,998 patients, of whom 91% were hypertensive. ACE inhibitors were used as the active treatment in seven trials (n=76,615) and angiotensin receptor blocker (ARB) in 13 trials (n=82,383).
ACE inhibitors were associated with a statistically significant 10% mortality reduction: (HR 0.90; 95% CI, 0.84–0.97; P=0.004). In contrast, no significant mortality reduction was observed with ARB treatment (HR 0.99; 95% CI, 0.94–1.04; P=0.683). Analysis of mortality reduction by different ACE inhibitors showed that perindopril-based regimens are associated with a statistically significant 13% all-cause mortality reduction.
Taking into account the broad spectrum of the hypertensive population, one might expect that an effective treatment with ACE inhibitors, in particular with perindopril, would result in an important gain of lives saved.

Equivalent doses in hypertension
The ACE inhibitors have different strengths with different starting dosages. Dosage should be adjusted according to the clinical response.

Combination with angiotensin II receptor antagonists
ACE inhibitors possess many common characteristics with another class of cardiovascular drugs, angiotensin II receptor antagonists, which are often used when patients are intolerant of the adverse effects produced by ACE inhibitors. ACE inhibitors do not completely prevent the formation of angiotensin II, as blockage is dose-dependent, so angiotensin II receptor antagonists may be useful because they act to prevent the action of angiotensin II at the AT1 receptor, leaving AT2 receptor unblocked; the latter may have consequences needing further study.

The combination therapy of angiotensin II receptor antagonists with ACE inhibitors may be superior to either agent alone. This combination may increase levels of bradykinin while blocking the generation of angiotensin II and its activity at the AT1 receptor. This 'dual blockade' may be more effective than using an ACE inhibitor alone, because angiotensin II can be generated via non-ACE-dependent pathways. Preliminary studies suggest this combination of pharmacologic agents may be advantageous in the treatment of essential hypertension, chronic heart failure, and nephropathy. However, the more recent ONTARGET study showed no benefit of combining the agents and more adverse events. While statistically significant results have been obtained for its role in treating hypertension, clinical significance may be lacking. There are warnings about the combination of ACE inhibitors with ARBs.

Patients with heart failure may benefit from the combination in terms of reducing morbidity and ventricular remodeling.

The most compelling evidence for the treatment of nephropathy has been found: This combination therapy partially reversed the proteinuria and also exhibited a renoprotective effect in patients with diabetic nephropathy, and pediatric IgA nephropathy.

History
 
Leonard T. Skeggs and his colleagues (including Norman Shumway) discovered ACE in plasma in 1956. It was also noted that those who worked in banana plantations in South-western Brazil collapsed after being bitten by a pit viper, leading to a search for a blood pressure lowering component in its venom. Brazilian scientist Sérgio Henrique Ferreira reported a bradykinin-potentiating factor (BPF) present in the venom of Bothrops jararaca, a South American pit viper, in 1965. Ferreira then went to John Vane's laboratory as a postdoctoral fellow with his already-isolated BPF. The conversion of the inactive angiotensin I to the potent angiotensin II was thought to take place in the plasma. However, in 1967, Kevin K. F. Ng and John R. Vane showed plasma ACE is too slow to account for the conversion of angiotensin I to angiotensin II in vivo. Subsequent investigation showed rapid conversion occurs during its passage through the pulmonary circulation.

Bradykinin is rapidly inactivated in the circulating blood, and it disappears completely in a single pass through the pulmonary circulation. Angiotensin I also disappears in the pulmonary circulation because of its conversion to angiotensin II. Furthermore, angiotensin II passes through the lungs without any loss. The inactivation of bradykinin and the conversion of angiotensin I to angiotensin II in the lungs was thought to be caused by the same enzyme. In 1970, Ng and Vane, using BPF provided by Ferreira, showed the conversion is inhibited during its passage through the pulmonary circulation.

BPFs are members of a family of peptides whose potentiating action is linked to inhibition of bradykinin by ACE. Molecular analysis of BPF yielded a nonapeptide BPF teprotide (SQ 20,881), which showed the greatest ACE inhibition potency and hypotensive effect in vivo. Teprotide had limited clinical value as a result of its peptide nature and lack of activity when given orally. In the early 1970s, knowledge of the structure-activity relationship required for inhibition of ACE was growing. David Cushman, Miguel Ondetti and colleagues used peptide analogues to study the structure of ACE, using carboxypeptidase A as a model. Their discoveries led to the development of captopril, the first orally-active ACE inhibitor, in 1975.

Captopril was approved by the United States Food and Drug Administration in 1981. The first nonsulfhydryl-containing ACE inhibitor, enalapril, was marketed two years later. At least 12 other ACE inhibitors have since been marketed.

In 1991, Japanese scientists created the first milk-based ACE inhibitor, in the form of a fermented milk drink, using specific cultures to liberate the tripeptide isoleucine-proline-proline (IPP) from the dairy protein. Valine-proline-proline (VPP) is also liberated in this process—another milk tripeptide with a very similar chemical structure to IPP. Together, these peptides are now often referred to as lactotripeptides. In 1996, the first human study confirmed the blood pressure-lowering effect of IPP in fermented milk. Although twice the amount of VPP is needed to achieve the same ACE-inhibiting activity as the originally discovered IPP, VPP also is assumed to add to the total blood pressure lowering effect.
Since the first lactotripeptides discovery, more than 20 human clinical trials have been conducted in many different countries.

Note

See also
 Angiotensin II receptor blocker
 Discovery and development of angiotensin receptor blockers
 Loop diuretic, also used to treat CHF
 Renin inhibitor

References

External links

 
 ACE Inhibitors: Summary of Recommendations – Consumer Reports Best Buy Drugs – free public education project
 From snake venom to ACE inhibitor — the discovery and rise of captopril

ACE inhibitors